Dino Beširović (born 31 January 1994) is a Portuguese-born Bosnian professional footballer who plays as a defensive midfielder for Mezőkövesd and the Bosnia and Herzegovina national team.

Beširović started his professional career at Radnik Bijeljina, before joining Hajduk Split in 2018.

Beširović made his senior international debut for Bosnia and Herzegovina in 2018.

Club career

Early career
Beširović came through Académico de Viseu's youth setup, which he left in February 2015 to join Radnik Bijeljina. He made his professional debut against Široki Brijeg on 28 February at the age of 21. On 15 March, he scored his first professional goal against Slavija.

He became club's captain in 2017.

Hajduk Split
On 19 June 2018, Beširović was transferred to Croatian side Hajduk Split for an undisclosed fee. He made his competitive debut for the club against Osijek on 29 July. On 2 August, in UEFA Europa League qualifier against Slavia Sofia, he suffered a severe knee injury, which was diagnosed as anterior cruciate ligament tear and was sidelined until the end of season.

International career
In August 2017, Beširović received his first senior call-up to Bosnia and Herzegovina, for 2018 FIFA World Cup qualifiers against Cyprus and Gibraltar, but had to wait until 28 January 2018 to make his debut, in a friendly game against United States.

Personal life
Beširović's father Nail, was also a professional footballer.

Career statistics

Club

International

Honours
Radnik Bijeljina
Bosnian Cup: 2015–16

References

External links

1994 births
Living people
People from Viseu
Portuguese people of Bosnia and Herzegovina descent
Citizens of Bosnia and Herzegovina through descent
Bosnia and Herzegovina footballers
Bosnia and Herzegovina international footballers
Bosnia and Herzegovina expatriate footballers
Association football midfielders
FK Radnik Bijeljina players
HNK Hajduk Split players
Mezőkövesdi SE footballers
Premier League of Bosnia and Herzegovina players
Croatian Football League players
Nemzeti Bajnokság I players
Expatriate footballers in Croatia
Expatriate footballers in Hungary
Bosnia and Herzegovina expatriate sportspeople in Croatia
Bosnia and Herzegovina expatriate sportspeople in Hungary